Clouseau is a Belgian pop group, having success in Belgium and the Netherlands since being established in the late 1980s. Apart from a brush with English material in the early 1990s they perform in Dutch. Their biggest hits are "Daar gaat ze" ("There she goes", a #1 hit in the Netherlands in 1990, and rerecorded in English as "Close Encounters") and "Passie" ("Passion", a #1 hit in the Netherlands in 1995).

History

1987–1990
Clouseau was set up by Bob Savenberg, who named the band after Inspector Clouseau, a character he enjoyed imitating and after whom he had named his radio station.

Initially, Clouseau only performed at local venues. Singer Koen Wauters soon left the group to sing for another local band, but in 1987 he was persuaded to return.

The same year they were discovered at the Marktrock festival in Leuven, Belgium. Their first single "Brandweer" ("Firemen", also a pun that can be interpreted as "Burning again") sold 427 copies. Their television debut followed in November of that year.

In 1989 Clouseau participated in the Belgian tryouts for the Eurovision Song Contest with the song "Anne". Clouseau came in second, but "Anne" became an enormous hit in Belgium and a (minor) hit in the Netherlands. The popularity of Clouseau in Belgium skyrocketed, and that year Clouseau produced its first album, "Hoezo?" ("Whaddayamean?").

In 1990 "Daar gaat ze" topped the singles charts in both Belgium and the Netherlands; several more hits followed. On September 30, Tjen Berghmans left the group after a dispute.

In October 1990 Clouseau released their second album, Of zo... (Or so...). In March 1991, Karel Theys departed, leaving Clouseau as a three-piece. A month later Clouseau came in 16th in the Eurovision Song Contest with "Geef het op", but their participation resulted in a European breakthrough.

1991–1999
Afterwards it was announced that Koen Wauters was called up for the army; because of his Clouseau-commitments he only had to serve four weeks and didn't need to shave his head. Fall 1991, Clouseau released their first English language album; Close Encounters (of which the title track is a translation of "Daar gaat ze") was a huge success in Germany. The Dutch fans were less keen on the idea of Koen Wauters singing in another language and rather bought the live-album that was released during this period.

In 1992 Clouseau released a Dutch-language album, Doorgaan (Keep on going). At the same time, they supported Swedish group Roxette on their European tour performing the Close Encounters-material.

The second English-language album, 1993's In every small town was recorded in Los Angeles. However, the album failed critically, receiving little attention outside the Benelux countries. Since then, Clouseau has refrained from producing English-language music (except for occasional singles, e.g. "Weather With You" (Crowded House cover) in 2000).

In 1995 they released the Oker album, which featured the single "Passie". In 1996, founder Bob Savenberg left the group. At the time he hosted the television format of the Ultratop 50. Bob Savenberg now works with upcoming artists as a manager.

In September 1996 Clouseau released the Adrenaline album, which was promoted with a large tour.

On 22 December 1998 singer Koen Wauters married the Dutch television journalist and one-time MTV-presenter Carolyn Lilipaly (they divorced in 2002). 1999 saw the release of In Stereo. Clouseau were heading for a new direction. A live album was released in 2000, and Clouseau were touring Belgium and the Netherlands.

2000–2009
In 2001, Clouseau released the disco oriented CD En Dans (And Dance); the artwork was designed by Marcel Vanthilt and the title track became a huge hit. Whilst the fans were waiting for new material, the two remaining bandmembers presented the 2003 and 2004 editions of Idool (the Belgian version of Idols) on VTM. In October 2004 they released the Vanbinnen (Inside) album.

Since 2002 Clouseau are playing multiple Christmas shows at the Sportpaleis Antwerp. These concerts are a huge success with tickets selling out well in advance and each year's series surpassing the previous. In 2005, 13 shows attracted over 200,000 visitors in total. Due to Koen's Dakar-participation they couldn't add any further dates.

In 2006 Clouseau performed in Antwerp at the 0110 concerts for tolerance, organised by Tom Barman, singer/guitarist with dEUS. At that moment seven shows were added for that year's Christmas stint (Clouseau Speciale Editie).

The band released their latest CD Vonken & Vuur (Sparks & Flames) in March 2007 with "De Tegenpartij" ("The Opposition Party") being the first single. The Dutch release followed a month later.

Their 20th anniversary was celebrated with the tribute album Braveau Clouseau.

On 5 December 2008 Clouseau played the first of their Crescendo Christmas-shows.

In 2009 they expressed their tiredness of Belgian communal tensions in a pro-Belgium song, a novelty in Flemish commercial popular culture. They toured across railway-stations and festivals which included their first show in the Netherlands in nine years.

In 2017 a documentary was aired in honour of their 30th anniversary.

Members
 Tjen Berghmans (up to September 1990)
 Karel Theys (up to March 1991)
 Bob Savenberg (up to 1996)
 Kris Wauters
 Koen Wauters

Band
 Jos Michiels (Percussion)
 Hans Francken (Keyboards)
 Herman Cambré (Drums)
 Eric Melaerts (Guitar)
 Tom Lodewyckx (Guitar)
 Vincent Pierens (Bass Guitar)

Discography

Albums
 Hoezo? (1989)
 Of zo... (1990)
 Close Encounters (1991)
 Live '91 (1991)
 Doorgaan (1993)
 In Every Small Town (1993)
 Het Beste van (1993)
 Oker (1995)
 Adrenaline (1996)
 87- 97 (1997)
 In Stereo (1999)
 Live (2000)
 Ballades (2001)
 En Dans (2001)
 Live in het Sportpaleis DVD ("Live at the Sport Palace, Antwerp") (2003)
 Vanbinnen (2004)
 Clouseau in 't lang DVD ("Live at the Sport Palace, Antwerp") (2006)
 Vonken en Vuur (2007)
 Zij Aan Zij (2009)
 Clouseau (2013)
 Clouseau Danst (2016)
 Tweesprong (2019)
 Jonge wolven'' (2022)

Singles

References

External links

 

Belgian pop music groups
Eurovision Song Contest entrants for Belgium
Eurovision Song Contest entrants of 1991